Justice Raghuvendra Singh Rathore (born 1 July 1953) is a former judge at the Jaipur bench of Rajasthan High Court

Early life and education

Justice Raghuvendra Singh Rathore was born on 1 July 1953. He went to Mayo College Ajmer for his schooling and passed out in the year 1970. Justice Rathore graduated from Kirori Mal College, New Delhi. After finishing B.A. (Hons.) Justice Rathore enrolled himself for education in Law and completed LL.B. from University of Rajasthan, Jaipur in 1977.

Career

Shri Raghuvendra Singh Rathore enrolled himself as Advocate with Bar Council of Rajasthan on 5 November 1977. Shri Rathore practised in civil criminal and constitutional branches of law. He was appointed as Additional Advocate General by the State Government of Rajasthan. He also represented a number of Government as well as non-Government Departments.

He was appointed to the National Green Tribunal in January 2016.

Judgeship

On 5 July 2007 Justice Raghuvendra Singh Rathore was elevated an Additional Judge of Rajasthan High Court. Since then Justice Raghuvendra Singh Rathore is sitting at Jaipur bench of Rajasthan High Court.

Daughter

In 2013, Rathore was reported to have been confining his daughter at home in order to prevent her from marrying her boyfriend. The Supreme Court ordered the police to hand her over to her boyfriend.

References

External links
 Official webpage at Rajasthan High Court

Judges of the Rajasthan High Court
1953 births
Living people
People from Ajmer
Mayo College alumni
Kirori Mal College alumni
University of Rajasthan alumni
20th-century Indian judges